The Hockey Club Neuilly-sur-Marne is a French ice hockey club based in Neuilly-sur-Marne. The men's representative team, Les Bisons de Neuilly-sur-Marne, plays in the second-tier FFHG Division 1.

History
The club was founded in 1974 as HC Neuilly-sur-Marne. Its home arena is the Patinoire municipale de Neuilly-sur-Marne (Municipal Ice Rink of Neuilly-sur-Marne).

Les Bisons were Division 1 champions in 2007–08 and 2010–11.

Notable alumni
 Canadian
 Rane Carnegie
 Terry Harrison

 Canadian-Israeli
 	
Eliezer Sherbatov (born 1991), Canadian-Israeli ice hockey player

 Czech
 Tomáš Myšička

 American
 Michael Steiner

References

External links
 Official website 

Ice hockey teams in France
Sport in Seine-Saint-Denis
Ice hockey clubs established in 1974
1974 establishments in France